is a trans-Neptunian object located in the outermost region of the Solar System.

Due to the object's high eccentricity and large perihelia,  is an extreme trans-Neptunian object from the scattered disc (ESDO). It was a lost minor planet until it was recovered in June 2021.

Orbit and classification 

Based on an observation arc of 14.9 years with 26 observations in total,  orbits the Sun at a distance of 39.6–356.8 AU once every 2790 years (1,019,048 days; semi-major axis of 198.2 AU). Its orbit has an eccentricity of 0.80 and an inclination of 17° with respect to the ecliptic.

,  belongs to a small number of 21 high-eccentricity and large-perihelia objects (q > 38 AU) with a semi-major axis of larger than 150 AU, which are the defining orbital parameters of the group of extreme scattered disc object, or ESDO. It is thought that objects cannot reach such orbits without some perturbing object outside the eight planets, which has led to the speculation of Planet Nine.

References

External links 
 List Of Transneptunian Objects, Minor Planet Center
 List of Known Trans-Neptunian Objects, Johnston's Archive
 

Minor planet object articles (unnumbered)

20030928